The 2014–15 Milwaukee Bucks season was the 47th season of the franchise in the National Basketball Association (NBA). On December 27, 2014, they matched the total number of wins (15) from the 2013–14 season, their lowest in franchise history.

The Bucks finished the regular season 41–41, a 26 win improvement from their disappointing previous season, and clinched the sixth seed despite losing their top pick Jabari Parker to an injury early in the season. The Bucks' season ended with a 2–4 first round playoff series loss to the Chicago Bulls.

Offseason

Draft picks

Roster

Standings

Game log

Preseason

|- style="background:#cfc;"
| 1
| October 8
| Memphis
| 
| Khris Middleton (17)
| Larry Sanders (15)
| Brandon Knight (6)
| Resch Center4,685
| 1–0
|- style="background:#fcc;"
| 2
| October 9
| @ Detroit
| 
| Khris Middleton (13)
| Giannis Antetokounmpo (7)
| Brandon Knight (7)
| Palace of Auburn Hills8,472
| 1–1
|- style="background:#fcc;"
| 3
| October 11
| Chicago
| 
| Larry Sanders (14)
| Zaza Pachulia (11)
| Kendall Marshall (6)
| BMO Harris Bradley Center10,769
| 1–2
|- style="background:#fcc;"
| 4
| October 14
| @ Cleveland
| 
| Jabari Parker (18)
| Ersan İlyasova (9)
| Jerryd Bayless (9)
| Quicken Loans Arena19,102
| 1–3
|- style="background:#cfc;"
| 5
| October 17
| @ Minnesota
| 
| Jabari Parker (21)
| Jabari Parker (11)
| Kendall Marshall (6)
| U.S. Cellular Center6,801
| 2–3
|- style="background:#cfc;"
| 6
| October 20
| @ New York
| 
| O. J. Mayo (24)
| John Henson (10)
| Kendall Marshall (5)
| Madison Square Garden19,812
| 3–3
|- style="background:#fcc;"
| 7
| October 22
| Minnesota
| 
| Jabari Parker (18)
| Jabari Parker (9)
| Brandon Knight (6)
| BMO Harris Bradley Center6,103
| 3–4

Regular season

|- style="background:#fcc;"
| 1
| October 29
| @ Charlotte
| 
| Brandon Knight (22)
| Brandon Knight (8)
| Brandon Knight (13)
| Time Warner Cable Arena19,439
| 0–1
|- style="background:#cfc;"
| 2
| October 31
| Philadelphia
| 
| O. J. Mayo (25)
| Larry Sanders (15)
| Brandon Knight (8)
| BMO Harris Bradley Center18,717
| 1–1

|- style="background:#fcc"
| 3
| November 1
| @ Washington
| 
| Brandon Knight (24)
| Jabari Parker (11)
| Brandon Knight (6)
| Verizon Center17,992
| 1–2
|- style="background:#cfc;"
| 4
| November 4
| @ Indiana
| 
| Brandon Knight (23)
| Larry Sanders (10)
| O. J. Mayo (5)
| Bankers Life Fieldhouse15,012
| 2–2
|- style="background:#fcc"
| 5
| November 5
| Chicago
| 
| Giannis Antetokounmpo (13)
| Sanders & Knight (9)
| Brandon Knight (7)
| BMO Harris Bradley Center13,098
| 2–3
|- style="background:#fcc"
| 6
| November 7
| @ Detroit
| 
| Jabari Parker (18)
| Brandon Knight (6)
| Brandon Knight (9)
| The Palace of Auburn Hills16,102
| 2–4
|- style="background:#cfc;"
| 7
| November 8
| Memphis
| 
| Giannis Antetokounmpo (13)
| Ersan İlyasova (9)
| O. J. Mayo (7)
| BMO Harris Bradley Center13,841
| 3–4
|- style="background:#cfc;"
| 8
| November 11
| Oklahoma City
| 
| O. J. Mayo (19)
| Zaza Pachulia (10)
| Knight & Pachulia (4)
| BMO Harris Bradley Center13,390
| 4–4
|- style="background:#fcc"
| 9
| November 14
| @ Orlando
| 
| Brandon Knight (24)
| Giannis Antetokounmpo (7)
| Brandon Knight (5)
| Amway Center15,947
| 4–5
|- style="background:#cfc;"
| 10
| November 16
| @ Miami
| 
| Brandon Knight (20)
| Giannis Antetokounmpo (7)
| Brandon Knight (4)
| AmericanAirlines Arena19,680
| 5–5
|- style="background:#cfc;"
| 11
| November 18
| New York
| 
| Ersan İlyasova (20)
| Zaza Pachulia (13)
| Brandon Knight (9)
| BMO Harris Bradley Center12,190
| 6–5
|- style="background:#cfc;"
| 12
| November 19
| @ Brooklyn
| 
| Jabari Parker (23)
| Giannis Antetokounmpo (12)
| Brandon Knight (8)
| Barclays Center15,694
| 7–5
|-style="background:#fcc"
| 13
| November 21
| @ Toronto
| 
| Jabari Parker (15)
| Jabari Parker (6)
| Kendall Marshall (4)
| Air Canada Centre19,800
| 7–6
|- style="background:#fcc;"
| 14
| November 22
| Washington
| 
| Brandon Knight (27)
| Zaza Pachulia (7)
| Brandon Knight (6)
| BMO Harris Bradley Center14,254
| 7–7
|- style="background:#cfc;"
| 15
| November 25
| Detroit
| 
| Brandon Knight (20)
| Parker, Sanders & İlyasova (9)
| Brandon Knight (8)
| BMO Harris Bradley Center15,265
| 8–7
|- style="background:#cfc;"
| 16
| November 26
| @ Minnesota
| 
| Sanders & Knight (15)
| Giannis Antetokounmpo (8)
| Antetokounmpo & Bayless (4)
| Target Center14,710
| 9–7
|- style="background:#cfc;"
| 17
| November 28
| @ Detroit
| 
| Ersan İlyasova (22)
| Giannis Antetokounmpo (9)
| Kendall Marshall (8)
| The Palace of Auburn Hills13,127
| 10–7
|- style="background:#fcc;"
| 18
| November 29
| Houston
| 
| Jabari Parker (19)
| Jabari Parker (9)
| Jabari Parker (5)
| BMO Harris Bradley Center16,119
| 10–8

|- style="background:#fcc;"
| 19
| December 2
| @ Cleveland
| 
| Brandon Knight (27)
| Jabari Parker (8)
| Brandon Knight (8)
| Quicken Loans Arena20,562
| 10–9
|- style="background:#fcc;"
| 20
| December 3
| Dallas
| 
| Brandon Knight (25)
| Zaza Pachulia (9)
| Knight, Mayo & Antetokounmpo (5)
| BMO Harris Bradley Center13,568
| 10–10
|- style="background:#cfc;"
| 21
| December 5
| Miami
| 
| Kendall Marshall (20)
| Zaza Pachulia (8)
| Jerryd Bayless (5)
| BMO Harris Bradley Center16,325
| 11–10
|- style="background:#fcc;"
| 22
| December 7
| @ Dallas
| 
| Giannis Antetokounmpo (18)
| Larry Sanders (9)
| Brandon Knight (5)
| American Airlines Center19,413
| 11–11
|- style="background:#fcc;"
| 23
| December 9
| @ Oklahoma City
| 
| O. J. Mayo (18)
| Giannis Antetokounmpo (7)
| Jerryd Bayless (6)
| Chesapeake Energy Arena18,203
| 11–12
|- style="background:#cfc;"
| 24
| December 13
| L.A. Clippers
| 
| Brandon Knight (22)
| Larry Sanders (9)
| Kendall Marshall (6)
| BMO Harris Bradley Center16,227
| 12–12
|- style="background:#cfc;"
| 25
| December 15
| @ Phoenix
| 
| Brandon Knight (20)
| Giannis Antetokounmpo (8)
| Pachulia & Dudley (5)
| U.S. Airways Center17,327
| 13–12
|- style="background:#fcc;"
| 26
| December 17
| @ Portland
| 
| Brandon Knight (24)
| Zaza Pachulia (8)
| Jared Dudley (5)
| Moda Center19,495
| 13–13
|- style="background:#cfc;"
| 27
| December 18
| @ Sacramento
| 
| Brandon Knight (20)
| Pachulia, Knight & Dudley (5)
| Kendall Marshall (6)
| Sleep Train Arena15,645
| 14–13
|- style="background:#fcc;"
| 28
| December 20
| @ L.A. Clippers
| 
| Giannis Antetokounmpo (18)
| Giannis Antetokounmpo (9)
| Giannis Antetokounmpo (6)
| Staples Center19,060
| 14–14
|- style="background:#fcc;"
| 29
| December 23
| Charlotte
| 
| Brandon Knight (34)
| Larry Sanders (8)
| Brandon Knight (5)
| BMO Harris Bradley Center14,653
| 14–15
|- style="background:#cfc;"
| 30
| December 26
| @ Atlanta
| 
| Jared Dudley (24)
| Zaza Pachulia (8)
| Marshall & Antetokounmpo (5)
| Philips Arena19,016
| 15–15
|- style="background:#fcc;"
| 31
| December 27
| Atlanta
| 
| Khris Middleton (21)
| Zaza Pachulia (15)
| Jerryd Bayless (6)
| BMO Harris Bradley Center16,788
| 15–16
|- style="background:#cfc;"
| 32
| December 29
| @ Charlotte
| 
| Brandon Knight (18)
| Jared Dudley (9)
| Kendall Marshall (6)
| Time Warner Cable Arena17,430
| 16–16
|- style="background:#cfc;"
| 33
| December 31
| @ Cleveland
| 
| Brandon Knight (26)
| Antetokounmpo, Pachulia & Middleton (8)
| Giannis Antetokounmpo (5)
| Quicken Loans Arena20,562
| 17–16

|- style="background:#fcc;"
| 34
| January 2
| Indiana
| 
| Brandon Knight (20)
| Zaza Pachulia (14)
| Brandon Knight (7)
| BMO Harris Bradley Center16,238
| 17–17
|- style="background:#cfc;"
| 35
| January 4
| @ New York
| 
| Brandon Knight (17)
| Zaza Pachulia (14)
| Brandon Knight (5)
| Madison Square Garden19,812
| 18–17
|- style="background:#fcc;"
| 36
| January 6
| Phoenix
| 
| Brandon Knight (26)
| Giannis Antetokounmpo (12)
| Knight & Marshall (4)
| BMO Harris Bradley Center12,311
| 18–18
|- style="background:#cfc;"
| 37
| January 7
| @ Philadelphia
| 
| Knight & Middleton (18)
| Zaza Pachulia (12)
| Zaza Pachulia (7)
| Wells Fargo Center10,288
| 19–18
|- style="background:#cfc;"
| 38
| January 9
| Minnesota
| 
| Brandon Knight (14)
| Zaza Pachulia (9)
| Kendall Marshall (9)
| BMO Harris Bradley Center15,480
| 20–18
|- style="background:#fcc;"
| 39
| January 10
| @ Chicago
| 
| Brandon Knight (20)
| John Henson (7)
| Brandon Knight (5)
| United Center21,781
| 20–19
|- style="background:#cfc;"
| 40
| January 15
| New York
| 
| O. J. Mayo (22)
| Zaza Pachulia (14)
| Brandon Knight (6)
| The O2 Arena18,689
| 21–19
|- style="background:#fcc;"
| 41
| January 19
| Toronto
| 
| Brandon Knight (20)
| Ersan İlyasova (7)
| Knight & Antetokounmpo (5)
| BMO Harris Bradley Center12,707
| 21–20
|- style="background:#fcc;"
| 42
| January 22
| Utah
| 
| Knight & Dudley (16)
| Zaza Pachulia (10)
| Jerryd Bayless (9)
| BMO Harris Bradley Center12,415
| 21–21
|- style="background:#cfc;"
| 43
| January 24
| Detroit
| 
| O. J. Mayo (20)
| Khris Middleton (7)
| Jerryd Bayless (8)
| BMO Harris Bradley Center16,388
| 22–21
|- style="background:#fcc;"
| 44
| January 25
| @ San Antonio
| 
| Khris Middleton (21)
| John Henson (9)
| O. J. Mayo (7)
| AT&T Center18,581
| 22–22
|- style="background:#cfc;"
| 45
| January 27
| @ Miami
| 
| Knight & Middleton (17)
| John Henson (9)
| Jerryd Bayless (7)
| AmericanAirlines Arena19,789
| 23–22
|- style="background:#cfc;"
| 46
| January 29
| @ Orlando
| 
| Jerryd Bayless (19)
| John Henson (11)
| Brandon Knight (9)
| Amway Center16,071
| 24–22
|- style="background:#cfc;"
| 47
| January 31
| Portland
| 
| Jared Dudley (18)
| Giannis Antetokounmpo (10)
| Brandon Knight (8)
| BMO Harris Bradley Center18,717
| 25–22

|- style="background:#cfc;"
| 48
| February 2
| @ Toronto
| 
| Khris Middleton (25)
| Giannis Antetokounmpo (12)
| Jerryd Bayless (9)
| Air Canada Centre19,800
| 26–22
|- style="background:#cfc;"
| 49
| February 4
| L.A. Lakers
| 
| Giannis Antetokounmpo (25)
| Brandon Knight (8)
| Knight & Henson & Middleton (7)
| BMO Harris Bradley Center12,544
| 27–22
|- style="background:#fcc;"
| 50
| February 6
| @ Houston
| 
| Giannis Antetokounmpo (27)
| Giannis Antetokounmpo (15)
| Brandon Knight (11)
| Toyota Center18,239
| 27–23
|- style="background:#cfc;"
| 51
| February 7
| Boston
| 
| Brandon Knight (26)
| Giannis Antetokounmpo (11)
| Knight & Antetokounmpo (5)
| BMO Harris Bradley Center16,470
| 28–23
|- style="background:#cfc;"
| 52
| February 9
| Brooklyn
| 
| Jared Dudley (19)
| Giannis Antetokounmpo (9)
| Giannis Antetokounmpo (8)
| BMO Harris Bradley Center12,431
| 29–23
|- style="background:#cfc;"
| 53
| February 11
| Sacramento
| 
| O. J. Mayo (21)
| Khris Middleton (10)
| Brandon Knight (5)
| BMO Harris Bradley Center13,046
| 30–23
|- align="center"
|colspan="9" bgcolor="#bbcaff"|All-Star Break
|- style="background:#cfc;"
| 54
| February 20
| Denver
| 
| Khris Middleton (15)
| Giannis Antetokounmpo (9)
| Jerryd Bayless (8)
| BMO Harris Bradley Center16,110
| 31–23
|- style="background:#fcc;"
| 55
| February 22
| Atlanta
| 
| Middleton & Antetokounmpo (19)
| John Henson (8)
| Khris Middleton (5)
| BMO Harris Bradley Center14,787
| 31–24
|- style="background:#fcc;"
| 56
| February 23
| @ Chicago
| 
| Khris Middleton (17)
| Ersan İlyasova (11)
| Jerryd Bayless (5)
| United Center21,434
| 31–25
|- style="background:#cfc;"
| 57
| February 25
| Philadelphia
| 
| Khris Middleton (19)
| Giannis Antetokounmpo (11)
| Michael Carter-Williams (8)
| BMO Harris Bradley Center12,763
| 32–25
|- style="background:#fcc;"
| 58
| February 27
| @ L. A. Lakers
| 
| Ersan İlyasova (17)
| Ersan İlyasova (12)
| Carter-Williams & Antetokounmpo & Ennis (4)
| Staples Center18,997
| 32–26
|- style="background:#fcc;"
| 59
| February 28
| @ Utah
| 
| Khris Middleton (18)
| Middleton & Mayo (6)
| Zaza Pachulia (5)
| Energy Solutions Arena19,515
| 32–27

|- style="background:#fcc;"
| 60
| March 3
| @ Denver
| 
| Ersan İlyasova (21)
| Giannis Antetokounmpo (11)
| Khris Middleton (6)
| Pepsi Center12,234
| 32–28
|- style="background:#fcc;"
| 61
| March 4
| @ Golden State
| 
| Michael Carter-Williams (16)
| Zaza Pachulia (11)
| Michael Carter-Williams (7)
| Oracle Arena19,596
| 32–29
|- style="background:#cfc;"
| 62
| March 7
| Washington
| 
| Khris Middleton (30)
| Khris Middleton (9)
| Michael Carter-Williams (9)
| BMO Harris Bradley Center18,717
| 33–29
|- style="background:#fcc;"
| 63
| March 9
| New Orleans
| 
| Giannis Antetokounmpo (29)
| John Henson (7)
| Michael Carter-Williams (7)
| BMO Harris Bradley Center18,717
| 33–30
|- style="background:#cfc;"
| 64
| March 11
| Orlando
| 
| Khris Middleton (30)
| Zaza Pachulia (12)
| Michael Carter-Williams (6)
| BMO Harris Bradley Center12,593
| 34–30
|- style="background:#fcc;"
| 65
| March 12
| @ Indiana
| 
| Michael Carter-Williams (28)
| Zaza Pachulia (12)
| Carter-Williams & Ennis (4)
| Bankers Life Fieldhouse15,729
| 34–31
|- style="background:#fcc;"
| 66
| March 14
| @ Memphis
| 
| Giannis Antetokounmpo (19)
| Giannis Antetokounmpo (6)
| Tyler Ennis (11)
| FedExForum18,119
| 34–32
|- style="background:#fcc;"
| 67
| March 17
| @ New Orleans
| 
| İlyasova & Antetokounmpo (15)
| Zaza Pachulia (11)
| Bayless & Antetokounmpo (5)
| Smoothie King Center17,881
| 34–33
|- style="background:#fcc;"
| 68
| March 18
| San Antonio
| 
| Giannis Antetokounmpo (19)
| Miles Plumlee (11)
| Michael Carter-Williams (6)
| BMO Harris Bradley Center14,831
| 34–34
|- style="background:#fcc;"
| 69
| March 20
| @ Brooklyn
| 
| Khris Middleton (29)
| Zaza Pachulia (21)
| Zaza Pachulia (7)
| Barclays Center16,272
| 34–35
|- style="background:#fcc;"
| 70
| March 22
| Cleveland
| 
| Michael Carter-Williams (19)
| Antetokounmpo & Pachulia (9)
| Khris Middleton (7)
| BMO Harris Bradley Center16,687
| 34–36
|- style="background:#cfc;"
| 71
| March 24
| Miami
| 
| Ersan İlyasova (19)
| İlyasova & Pachulia (11)
| Zaza Pachulia (7)
| BMO Harris Bradley Center12,313
| 35–36
|- style="background:#cfc;"
| 72
| March 26
| Indiana
| 
| Ersan İlyasova (34)
| İlyasova & Pachulia (6)
| Michael Carter-Williams (8)
| BMO Harris Bradley Center15,366
| 36–36
|- style="background:#fcc;"
| 73
| March 28
| Golden State
| 
| Khris Middleton (14)
| John Henson (7)
| Bayless & Mayo (5)
| BMO Harris Bradley Center18,717
| 36–37
|- style="background:#fcc;"
| 74
| March 30
| @ Atlanta
| 
| Giannis Antetokounmpo (18)
| Zaza Pachulia (13)
| Bayless & Carter-Williams (5)
| Philips Arena18,453
| 36–38

|- style="background:#cfc;"
| 75
| April 1
| Chicago
| 
| Michael Carter-Williams (21)
| Pachulia & Carter-Williams (10)
| Dudley & Mayo (5)
| BMO Harris Bradley Center15,215
| 37–38
|- style="background:#cfc;"
| 76
| April 3
| @ Boston
| 
| O. J. Mayo (24)
| Henson & Pachulia (8)
| Michael Carter-Williams (7)
| TD Garden18,624
| 38–38
|- style="background:#fcc;"
| 77
| April 4
| Orlando
| 
| Ersan İlyasova (18)
| Michael Carter-Williams (10)
| Michael Carter-Williams (9)
| BMO Harris Bradley Center14,090
| 38–39
|- style="background:#fcc;"
| 78
| April 8
| Cleveland
| 
| Michael Carter-Williams (30)
| Zaza Pachulia (10)
| Michael Carter-Williams (8)
| BMO Harris Bradley Center14,629
| 38–40
|- style="background:#cfc;"
| 79
| April 10
| @ New York
| 
| Giannis Antetokounmpo (20)
| Giannis Antetokounmpo (9)
| Michael Carter-Williams (7)
| Madison Square Garden19,812
| 39–40
|- style="background:#cfc;"
| 80
| April 12
| Brooklyn
| 
| Ersan İlyasova (21)
| Giannis Antetokounmpo (9)
| Antetokounmpo & Middleton (9)
| BMO Harris Bradley Center16,504
| 40–40
|- style="background:#cfc;"
| 81
| April 13
| @ Philadelphia
| 
| Michael Carter-Williams (30)
| Giannis Antetokounmpo (7)
| Michael Carter-Williams (5)
| Wells Fargo Center10,598
| 41–40
|- style="background:#fcc;"
| 82
| April 15
| Boston
| 
| Ersan İlyasova (21)
| Johnny O'Bryant (9)
| Tyler Ennis (8)
| BMO Harris Bradley Center17,316
| 41–41

Playoffs

|- style="background:#fbb;"
| 1
| April 18
| @ Chicago
| 
| Khris Middleton (18)
| Zaza Pachulia (10)
| Jerryd Bayless (5)
| United Center21,812
| 0–1
|- style="background:#fbb;"
| 2
| April 20
| @ Chicago
| 
| Khris Middleton (22)
| Giannis Antetokounmpo (11)
| Giannis Antetokounmpo (4)
| United Center21,661
| 0–2
|- style="background:#fbb;"
| 3
| April 23
| Chicago
| 
| Giannis Antetokounmpo (25)
| John Henson (14)
| Michael Carter-Williams (9)
| BMO Harris Bradley Center18,717
| 0–3
|- style="background:#bfb;"
| 4
| April 25
| Chicago
| 
| O. J. Mayo (18)
| Giannis Antetokounmpo (8)
| Carter-Williams, Dudley, Bayless (5)
| BMO Harris Bradley Center18,717
| 1–3
|- style="background:#bfb;"
| 5
| April 27
| @ Chicago
| 
| Michael Carter-Williams (22)
| John Henson (14)
| Michael Carter-Williams (9)
| United Center21,814
| 2–3
|- style="background:#fbb;"
| 6
| April 30
| Chicago
| 
| Zaza Pachulia (8)
| Miles Plumlee (6)
| Jerryd Bayless (5)
| BMO Harris Bradley Center18,717
| 2–4

Player statistics

Regular season

|- align="center" bgcolor=""
| 
| || || || || || || || || || ||
|- align="center" bgcolor="#f0f0f0"
| 
| || || || || || || || || || ||
|- align="center" bgcolor="#f0f0f0"
|  
| || || || || || || || || || ||
|- align="center" bgcolor="#f0f0f0"
| 
| || || || || || || || || || ||
|- align="center" bgcolor="#f0f0f0"
|  
| || || || || || || || || || ||
|- align="center" bgcolor="#f0f0f0"
| 
| || || || || || || || || || ||
|- align="center" bgcolor="#f0f0f0"
| 
| || || || || || || || || || ||
|- align="center" bgcolor="#f0f0f0"
| 
| || || || || || || || || || ||
|- align="center" bgcolor="#f0f0f0"
| 
| || || || || || || || || || ||
|- align="center" bgcolor="#f0f0f0"
| 
| || || || || || || || || || ||
|- align="center" bgcolor="#f0f0f0"
|  
| || || || || || || || || || ||
|- align="center" bgcolor="#f0f0f0"
|  
| || || || || || || || || || ||
|}
  Statistics with the Milwaukee Bucks.

Playoffs

|- align="center" bgcolor=""
| 
| || || || || || || || || || ||
|- align="center" bgcolor="#f0f0f0"
| 
| || || || || || || || || || ||
|- align="center" bgcolor="#f0f0f0"
| 
| || || || || || || || || || ||
|- align="center" bgcolor="#f0f0f0"
| 
| || || || || || || || || || ||
|- align="center" bgcolor="#f0f0f0"
| 
| || || || || || || || || || ||
|- align="center" bgcolor="#f0f0f0"
| 
| || || || || || || || || || ||
|- align="center" bgcolor="#f0f0f0"
| 
| || || || || || || || || || ||
|- align="center" bgcolor="#f0f0f0"
| 
| || || || || || || || || || ||
|- align="center" bgcolor="#f0f0f0"
| 
| || || || || || || || || || ||
|- align="center" bgcolor="#f0f0f0"
| 
| || || || || || || || || || ||
|}

Injuries

Awards

Transactions

Overview

Trades

Free agents

References

External links
 2014–15 Milwaukee Bucks preseason at ESPN
 2014–15 Milwaukee Bucks regular season at ESPN
 2014–15 Milwaukee Bucks postseason at ESPN

Milwaukee Bucks seasons
Milwaukee Bucks
Milwaukee Bucks
Milwaukee Bucks